The Men's 50 metre pistol event took place on 11 April 2018 at the Belmont Shooting Centre. Daniel Repacholi won the gold medal with a Games Record score. Shakil Ahmed won the silver medal and Om Mitharval won the bronze.

Results

Preliminaries

Final
The full final results were:

References

Shooting at the 2018 Commonwealth Games